Serranochromis janus is a species of cichlid endemic to the Malagarasi River in Tanzania preferring areas with plentiful vegetation and slow currents.  This species can reach a length of  SL.

References

External links 
 Drawing

janus
Endemic freshwater fish of Tanzania
Fish described in 1964
Taxa named by Ethelwynn Trewavas
Taxonomy articles created by Polbot